Raymond is a small town in Montgomery County, Illinois, United States. The population was 1,006 at the 2010 census.

Geography
Raymond is located at  (39.320834, -89.574373).

Demographics

At the 2000 census there were 927 people, 393 households, and 273 families in the village. The racial makeup of the village was 99.68% White, 0.11% African American and 0.22% Native American. Hispanic or Latino of any race were 0.22%.

Of the 393 households 29.0% had children under the age of 18 living with them, 59.3% were married couples living together, 7.6% had a female householder with no husband present, and 30.5% were non-families. 26.5% of households were one person and 16.5% were one person aged 65 or older. The average household size was 2.36 and the average family size was 2.85.

The age distribution was 23.8% under the age of 18, 5.9% from 18 to 24, 27.4% from 25 to 44, 20.6% from 45 to 64, and 22.2% 65 or older. The median age was 40 years. For every 100 females, there were 90.3 males. For every 100 females age 18 and over, there were 87.3 males.

The median household income was $37,500 and the median family income  was $45,341. Males had a median income of $29,750 versus $22,721 for females. The per capita income for the village was $18,231. About 6.0% of families and 8.4% of the population were below the poverty line, including 8.8% of those under age 18 and 11.1% of those age 65 or over.

Education
Raymond is the base of the Panhandle School District (also known as Panhandle CUSD #2). The district's offices are located on Broad Street and the district's only high school, Lincolnwood Sr. High School (shares building with Lincolnwood Jr. High School), is located on the extreme east end of Prairie Street (although the town is laid out in a slightly irregular fashion, making this street North Prairie Street, despite the fact that it runs east–west).

Raymond also has its own grade school, also located on Prairie Street, serving Pre-K through sixth grade. The communities of Farmersville, Waggoner and Harvel are also part of the Panhandle School District.

References

External links
Historical Society of Montgomery County

Villages in Montgomery County, Illinois
Villages in Illinois